Estola hirsuta is a species of beetle in the family Cerambycidae. It was described by DeGeer in 1775. It is known from Brazil, French Guiana, Panama, Guyana, and Suriname.

References

Estola
Beetles described in 1775
Taxa named by Charles De Geer